Raymond Erwin Davis (September 19, 1885 – September 9, 1965) was a quartermaster third class serving in the United States Navy who received the Medal of Honor for bravery.

Biography
Born in Mankato, Minnesota, Davis joined the U.S. Navy from Puget Sound, Washington. For his actions received the Medal of Honor on January 5, 1906.
 
He died September 9, 1965, at Retsil Veterans Home, Port Orchard and is buried in Seattle in the Calvary Cemetery, in the St. Paul plot, section 2, lot 39, site 4.

Medal of Honor citation
Rank and organization: Quartermaster Third Class U.S. Navy. Place and date: On board the U.S.S. Bennington, 21 July 1905. Entered service at: Puget Sound, Wash. Born: 19 September 1885, Mankato, Minn. G.O. No.: 13, 5 January 1906.

Citation:

Serving on board the U.S.S. Bennington, for extraordinary heroismdisplayed at the time of the explosion of a boiler of that vesselat San Diego, Calif., 21 July 1905.

See also

List of Medal of Honor recipients during peacetime

References

External links

1885 births
1965 deaths
United States Navy Medal of Honor recipients
United States Navy sailors
Military personnel from Minnesota
United States Navy personnel of World War I
Non-combat recipients of the Medal of Honor